The 1942 Columbia Lions football team was an American football team that represented Columbia University as an independent during the 1942 college football season. Home games were played in New York City at Baker Field in Upper Manhattan.

Under thirteenth-year head coach Lou Little, the Lions compiled a 3–6 record and were outscored 193 to 169. The team captains were Felix Demartini and Paul Governali.  

Ken Germann led the team in scoring, with 60 points (six touchdowns). Governali, the Heisman Trophy runner-up, led in total offense, with 1,610 yards (1,442 passing, 168 rushing).

Schedule

References

Columbia
Columbia Lions football seasons
Columbia Lions football